IMCO may refer to:

 the Intercontinental Manufacturing Company
 the Intermountain Manufacturing Company
 the Julius Meister & Co, Austrian lighter manufacturer
 the Committee on the Internal Market and Consumer Protection of the European Parliament
 the Mexican Institute for Competitiveness or Instituto Mexicano para la Competitividad
 the International Match Corporation, New York, founded 1923. Part of Kreuger & Toll. Bankrupt in 1932.
 the company IMCO Carbide Tool
 the (former) olympic windsurfing class Mistral One Design Class
 the Inter-Governmental Maritime Consultative Organization until 1982, today IMO
 the orthopedic surgical method, Intramedullary Cement Osteosynthesis